Hanumanji temple, Salangpur is a Hindu temple located in Salangpur, Gujarat and comes under the Vadtal Gadi of the Swaminarayan Sampraday. It is the only Swaminarayan Temple which does not have the Murtis of either Swaminarayan or Krishna as the Primary deity of worship. It is dedicated to Hanumanji in the form of Kastbhanjan (Crusher of sorrows). Hariprakash Dasji A.k.a. This Hanumanji temple is considered most holy and sacred. Hariprakash Swami is trustee at Present.

History and description

This temple is among the more prominent ones in the original Swaminarayan Sampraday. The idol of Hanuman was installed by Gopalanand Swami. According to author Raymond Williams, it is reported that when Sadguru Gopal Anand Swami installed the idol of Hanuman, he touched it with a rod and the idol came alive and moved. This story has become a charter for the healing ritual performed at this temple. The idol of Hanuman here is a stout figure with a handlebar moustache, crushing a female demon under his foot and baring his teeth, standing among sculpted foliage full of fruit bearing monkey attendants.  In 1899, Kothari Gordhandas of Vadtal appointed Shastri Yagnapurushdas to manage the affairs of the mandir; during his tenure, Shastri Yagnapurushdas renovated the site, built the adjacent bungalow, and acquired more land for the complex to bring it to its current state. Yagnapurushdas then broke away in 1907 and created BAPS. Govardhandas then appointed a new mahant of the temple of Sarangpur. Since, then the Vadtal Gadi has constructed additional improvements and buildings to the temple.

Following

The image of this temple is said to be so powerful that a mere look at it will drive the evil spirits out of the people affected by them. Saturday is the designated day for a special ritual (as Saturday is dedicated to Hanumanji) for those affected by mental illnesses and other disorders. They are brought to the temple to be touched by the rod used by Sadguru Gopalanand Swami during the installation ceremony of the image. This rod has now been covered in gold. The temple administration has hired a brahmin householder to act as a priest at the temple and conduct this ritual. After this, the person affected is instructed to circumambulate the shrine and repeat this after doing darshan a number of times. Some people take a special vow to do this a certain number of times or to chant the Swaminarayan Mahamantra while doing this.

References

External links
 Sarangpur Hanumanji Maha Aarti 
 Official website Kastbhanjan Hanumanji temple 

Swaminarayan temples in Gujarat
Hanuman temples
Hindu temples in Gujarat
Botad district